Gabia or Gabias may refer to:

Gabia, Gôh-Djiboua, Ivory Coast
Gabia, Sassandra-Marahoué, Ivory Coast
Las Gabias, Granada, Spain
André Gabias, politician from Quebec, Canada
Yves Gabias, politician from Quebec, Canada